Muskens is a surname. Notable people with the surname include:

Eefje Muskens (born 1989), Dutch badminton player
Martinus Petrus Maria Muskens (1935–2013), Dutch Roman Catholic bishop

See also
Musken, a village in Nordland, Norway